Paisley Abbey is a parish church of the Church of Scotland on the east bank of the White Cart Water in the centre of the town of Paisley, Renfrewshire, about  west of Glasgow, in Scotland. Its origins date from the 12th century, based on a former Cluniac monastery. Following the Reformation in the 16th century, it became a Church of Scotland parish kirk.

History
It is believed that Saint Mirin (or Saint Mirren) founded a community on this site in 7th century. Some time after his death a shrine to the Saint was established, becoming a popular site of pilgrimage and veneration. The name Paisley may derive from the Brythonic (Cumbric) Passeleg, 'basilica' (derived from the Greek), i.e. 'major church', recalling an early, though undocumented, ecclesiastical importance.

In 1163, Walter fitz Alan, the first High Steward of Scotland issued a charter for a priory to be set up on land owned by him in Paisley. It was dedicated to SS. Mary, James, Mirin and Milburga. Around 13 monks came from the Cluniac priory at Much Wenlock in Shropshire to found the community. Paisley grew so rapidly that it was raised to the status of abbey in 1245. Monks from Paisley founded Crossraguel Abbey in Carrick, Ayrshire, in 1244.

In 1307, Edward I of England had the abbey burned down. It was rebuilt later in the 14th century. William Wallace, born in nearby Elderslie, is believed to have been educated in the abbey for some time when he was a boy.

In 1316, Marjorie Bruce, daughter of Robert I of Scotland and wife of Walter Stewart, the sixth High Steward of Scotland, was out riding near the abbey. During the ride, she fell from her horse and as she was heavily pregnant at the time, she was taken to Paisley Abbey for medical care. There, King Robert II was born by caesarean section, in a time when anaesthesia would not have been available. She was later buried at the abbey.

In 1491, absolution was granted by Abbot George Shaw, representing the Pope and in the presence of the relics, to James IV of Scotland and others implicated in the death of James III at the Battle of Sauchieburn. By 1499 Shaw had had built a new, larger pilgrims' chapel and added the sculptured stone frieze which can still be seen today, showing scenes from the life of St Miren. It was originally brightly painted and may have been part of a rear panel of an altar before being put up as a frieze on the wall.

A succession of fires and the collapse of the tower in the 15th and 16th centuries left the building in a partially ruined state. Although the western section was still used for worship, the eastern section was widely plundered for its stone. From 1858 to 1928 the north porch and the eastern choir were reconstructed on the remains of the ruined walls by the architect Macgregor Chalmers. After his death, work on the choir was completed by Sir Robert Lorimer.

Points of interest
Paisley Abbey is the burial place of all six High Stewards of Scotland, Marjorie Bruce who was the mother of Robert II, and the wives of Robert II and King Robert III. The Celtic Barochan Cross, once sited near the village of Houston, Renfrewshire, is now inside the abbey itself. The cross is thought to date from the 10th century. In the abbey's nave, the Wallace Memorial Window, which depicts the image of Samson, was donated in 1873.

Paisley Abbey Drain 
In the early 1990s an ancient vaulted drain of extremely fine construction, probably 13th century in date, was rediscovered running from the abbey to the White Cart. The drain is thought to date from AD 1350-1400 and is at least 90 metres long, up to 2m wide and up to 2.2m high. The drain contains stonemasons marks on the walls, and marks where gates used to be.  Before accessing the drain, water has to be pumped out. 
Paisley Abbey Drain is designated by Historic Environment Scotland as a Scheduled Ancient Monument and has similarities to other monastery drains, such as Fountains Abbey, Dundrennan Abbey and Melrose Abbey. A virtual tour of the drain is available on YouTube.

Archaeological investigations and excavations took place in 1996, 3–16 September 2009, 2–12 September 2011 and 4 September 2013 and many items discovered. Some of these are now on display in the abbey.

These include:
 a slate with music marked on it - which is believed to be the oldest example of polyphonic music found in Scotland
 imported cloth seals
 chamber pots from c.1500
 tweezers
 carved bone handles
 pottery fragments
 slate fragments

Events to involve the public in the archaeological investigation of the drain have been held, with the Renfrewshire Local History Forum.

Tombs 

A tomb in the choir incorporating a much-restored female effigy is widely believed to be that of Marjorie Bruce. Although there is no evidence that she is buried at exactly that location, her remains are thought to be within the abbey. The tomb is reconstructed from fragments of different origin - the base, is likely to have originally formed part of the pulpitum of the Abbey (a stone screen separating nave and choir), such as survives at Glasgow Cathedral.

Opposite Marjorie Bruce lie the tombs of Robert III of Scotland and Simon fitz Alan. A Latin inscription commemorates the three children of Margaret Seton and Claud Hamilton, 1st Lord Paisley who died as infants; Margaret (1577), Henry (1585), and Alexander (1587).

Stained glass

Stained glass (removed in the Reformation) began to be replaced in the 1870s. Major works include a window by Edward Burne-Jones and the huge east window by Douglas Strachan.

The dramatic memorial window to James D. D. Shaw dates from 1989 and is by John Clark.

Abbey organ 

The Abbey organ is reputedly one of the finest in Scotland, and was originally built by the most distinguished of all 19th-century organ builders, Cavaillé-Coll of Paris in 1872. This is one of only six in the UK. Since 1872 it has been rebuilt and extended four times. The organ as rebuilt by Walker in 1968 has 4 manuals, 65 stops and 5448 pipes.(National Pipe Organ Register; "The Organ at Paisley Abbey", booklet pub. Paisley Abbey) In 2009 the instrument underwent a major restoration by Harrison and Harrison of Durham. The work included major cleaning and servicing, the provision of a new wind system and the addition of a 32 ft contre bombarde. The latter was part of the 1968 scheme by Ralph Downes but not included in the work actually undertaken.

Internal architectural details 
The twelve angel corbels and stone communion table are by Pilkington Jackson, sculptor of the iconic Robert the Bruce statue at Bannockburn. The ceiling bosses are designed by Sir Robert Lorimer and carved by James A Young. The choir stalls, with their wealth of carved animals are by William and Alexander Clow.

External architectural details 

Paisley Abbey has been rebuilt and its original design modified as a result of the building being destroyed in 1307, its tower's collapse in the 16th century, and general disrepair that occurred as the result of time and weather. Notably, during a restoration project that took place in the 1990s, a stonemason from Edinburgh hired to replace twelve crumbling stone gargoyles erected one bearing a strong resemblance to the space creature from the 1979 science fiction film Alien, starring Sigourney Weaver. A picture of the gargoyle went viral in 2013, though a photograph of the statue first surfaced on the internet in 1997. In 2002, it was confirmed the abbey would be subject to a 10-year-long restoration project.

Current congregation

Paisley Abbey is used for worship services every Sunday. Since the Reformation the Abbey has served as a parish church in the Church of Scotland. In 2002 the congregation had 823 members. The minister (since December 2022) is the Reverend Jim Gibson.

Burials
Isabella of Mar (c.1277–1296)
Marjorie Bruce
Robert III of Scotland (1337–1406)
William Cathcart, 1st Earl Cathcart (1755–1843)
Walter fitz Alan, 1st High Stewart of Scotland (1106 – June 1177)
Alan fitz Walter, 2nd High Steward of Scotland
Walter Stewart, 3rd High Steward of Scotland
Alexander Stewart, 4th High Steward of Scotland
James Stewart, 5th High Steward of Scotland
Walter Stewart, 6th High Steward of Scotland
Elizabeth Mure (died before May 1355)
James Hamilton, 1st Earl of Abercorn
Euphemia de Ross
James Hamilton, 8th Earl of Abercorn

See also
 Abbey Bridge
 Abbot of Paisley, for list of priors, abbots and commendators
 Crossraguel Abbey, founded by monks from Paisley
 List of Category A listed buildings in Renfrewshire
 List of listed buildings in Paisley, Renfrewshire

References

Sources
 Malden, John. (Edr), (2000). The Monastery & Abbey of Paisley: Lectures from the Renfrewshire Local History Forum's Conference 11 / 12 September 1999, with additional papers. Renfrewshire: Renfrewshire Local History Forum. .

External links 

 

Listed monasteries in Scotland
Cluniac monasteries in Scotland
Church of Scotland churches in Scotland
Churches in Paisley, Renfrewshire
Protestant churches converted from Roman Catholicism
Listed churches in Scotland
Category A listed buildings in Renfrewshire
Burial sites of the House of Stuart
Burial sites of the FitzAlan family
Burial sites of the House of Bruce
Former Christian monasteries in Scotland